Darevskia szczerbaki, Szczerbak's lizard, also spelled Shcherbak (Russian: ящерица щербака tr. yashcheritsa shcherbaka) is a lizard species in the genus Darevskia. It is endemic to Russia and named after the Ukrainian herpetologist Mykola Szczerbak. Its range along the Black Sea is restricted to areas with coastal cliffs, as they are the favored habitat of the lizard, which has difficulty adapting to most other environments. It is classified as an endangered species, and extinction is considered by some herpetologists because of the high amount of human development in the Caucasus coast and its popularity in the illegal lizard trade of Europe. It is rarely preyed upon, as its main two predators are the Common Kestrel and Olive Snake.

References

Darevskia
Reptiles described in 1963
Reptiles of Russia
Endemic fauna of Russia